Bobsleigh at the 2022 Winter Olympics has been held at the Xiaohaituo Bobsleigh and Luge Track which is one of the Yanqing cluster venues. A total of four bobsleigh events were held, between 4 and 20 February 2022.

In July 2018, the International Olympic Committee (IOC) officially added the women's monobob event to the program, increasing the total number of events to four. The IOC also transferred six quotas from the men's events to the women's. The quota limit of 170 athletes remained the same from the 2018 Winter Olympics. A total of four events have been contested, two each for men and women.

Qualification

A maximum of 170 quota spots will be available to athletes to compete at the games (124 men and 46 women). The qualification is based on the world rankings of 16 January 2022.

Competition schedule
The following is the competition schedule for all four events.

All times are in local time (UTC+8), according to the official schedule correct as of March 2021. This schedule may be subject to change in due time.

Medal summary

Medal table

Medalists

Participating nations
A total of 165 athletes (119 men and 46 women) from 23 nations (including the IOC's designation of ROC for the Russian Olympic Committee) qualified to participate.

The numbers in parenthesis represents the number of participants entered.

References

External links
Official Results Book – Bobsleigh

 
2022
2022 Winter Olympics events
2022 in bobsleigh